Ramnagar is a town situated in the Ramnagar Mandal of Bareilly District in Uttar Pradesh, India.

Villages in Ramnagar Mandal are Ramnagar, Ajmer, Alampur Kot, Anjani Mustkil, Atta Urfh Funda Nagar, Barathanpur, Bari Khera, Barsera Sikandarpur, Beudhan Buzurg, Beudhan Khurd,   Prathvipur(Ramnagar) and Chakarpur Gahi.

Villages near the town include ( 9.4 km ), Alampur Kot ( 2.0 km ), Udaybhanpur Urf Anandpur ( 2.7 km ), Bari Khera ( 2.8 km ), Tigra Khanpur ( 2.8 km ), Islamnagar Urf Dalippur ( 2.9 km ), and Mauchand Pur ( 2.9 km )

References 

Cities and towns in Bareilly district